The Saudi Arabian–Iraqi neutral zone was an area of  on the border between Saudi Arabia and Iraq within which the border between the two countries had not been settled. The neutral zone came into existence following the Uqair Protocol of 1922 that defined the border between Iraq and the Sultanate of Nejd (Saudi Arabia's predecessor state). An agreement to partition the neutral zone was reached by Iraqi and Saudi representatives on 26 December 1981, and approved by the Iraqi National Assembly on 28 January 1982. The actual division of the territory was made an unknown time after the agreement was reached, 30 July 1982 at the latest, but the border change was not officially filed with the United Nations until June 1991.

History
The Treaty of Muhammarah (Khorramshahr), 5 May 1922, forestalled the imminent conflict between the United Kingdom, which held the mandate for Iraq, and the Kingdom of Nejd, which later became Saudi Arabia (when combined with the Kingdom of Hejaz). It was signed by Prince Ahmed bin Abdullah on behalf of Abdulaziz Ibn Saud, King of Najd, who did not ratify the treaty. The treaty specifically avoided defining boundaries. Following further negotiations, the Protocol of Uqair (Uqayr), 2 December 1922, defined most of the borders between them and created the neutral zone. The protocol was ratified by Abdulaziz.

No military or permanent buildings were to be built in or near the neutral zone and the nomads of both countries were to have unimpeded access to its pastures and wells.

Administrative division of the zone was achieved in 1975, and a border treaty concluded in 1981. For unknown reasons, the treaty was not filed with the United Nations and nobody outside Iraq and Saudi Arabia was notified of the change or shown maps with details of the new boundary. As the Persian Gulf War approached in early 1991, Iraq cancelled all international agreements with Saudi Arabia since 1968. Saudi Arabia responded by registering all previous boundary agreements negotiated with Iraq at the United Nations in June 1991. That ended the legal existence of the Saudi Arabian–Iraqi neutral zone. 
Most official maps no longer show the diamond-shaped neutral zone but rather draw the border line approximately through the centre of the territory. For example, the United States Office of the Geographer regarded the area as having only an approximate boundary rather than a precise one.

The Saudi Arabian–Iraqi neutral zone formerly had the ISO 3166-1 codes NT and NTZ. The codes were discontinued in 1993. The FIPS 10-4 code for the Saudi Arabian–Iraqi neutral zone was IY; that code was deleted in 1992.

See also
 Geography of Iraq
 Geography of Saudi Arabia
 Unification of Saudi Arabia
 Saudi Arabia–United Arab Emirates border dispute
 Saudi–Kuwaiti neutral zone
 Iraq–Saudi Arabia border

References

Bibliography

External links 
 The Straight Dope on the Neutral Zone
 Arabian Boundary Disputes
 International Boundary Study No. 111

20th century in Saudi Arabia
20th century in Iraq
Disputed territories in the Persian Gulf
Territorial disputes of Saudi Arabia
Territorial disputes of Iraq
Iraq–Saudi Arabia border
Iraq–Saudi Arabia relations
1922 establishments in Asia
Demilitarized zones
1981 disestablishments in Asia